Herbert Horace Sydney Cock (14 March 1888 – 16 July 1968) was an Australian rules footballer who played with Collingwood and Carlton in the Victorian Football League (VFL).

Notes

External links 

Herbert Cock's profile at Blueseum

1888 births
1968 deaths
Australian rules footballers from Melbourne
Collingwood Football Club players
Carlton Football Club players
People from Clifton Hill, Victoria